In the Shadow of Your Wings (Unter dem Schatten deiner Flügel) is a collection of selected entries from the diary of Jochen Klepper covering the period between April 1932 and 10 December 1942. The book appeared in 1956.

The Protestant German writer, journalist and poet of ecclesiastical songs, Jochen Klepper, loses his creative power in the course of the above-mentioned ten years under steadily increasing National Socialist reprisals. Klepper is married with the Jew Johanna. Hanni, as Johanna is called, has brought two daughters from her first marriage. Klepper's younger stepdaughter Renate is threatened with deportation after the war begins.  Klepper applies for an exit permit for the young girl to go to Sweden. The author appeals to the security services. There his request is turned down. Klepper takes his own life together along the lives of his wife and child in a nondescript Berlin residential house.

Diary 
1932 Klepper suffers from his childlessness. He calls himself a "religious socialist". The work of the 30-year-old author is narrow. But Klepper is fulfilled as an intellectual by big desire for fame.
1933 To Kleppers understanding is not author who has merely ideas and materials. Author is who can express that quite peculiar "state of the liveliness" in his text. Talent would be unnecessary.
The Nazis have now all power monopolized. Klepper is at the Radio employed. He is denounced: "Jewish family. SPD member" is the accusation. The active employees will be suspended from service. Still Klepper not despondent. Because he holds fast to his faith, writes in his novel "The Father, Novel of the Soldier-King" (Stuttgart 1937) and loves his wife Hanni. Is Klepper "divine tool"? He has doubts.
Also  these odious "memoirs", which Klepper writes down - which value do they have? The writer will remain in the country at any rate. Abroad he sees no working possibility. Indeed, in Berlin the giants Ullstein and Ufa want his cooperation, however, do not pay. Thus Klepper would like to be taken up in the Empire Literature Chamber.
1934 The plan succeeds, because one of his guarantors is a SA man. Besides, Klepper calls the National Socialists "ill visionaries", if he entrusts with his worry about the future of Germany the diary.
1935 Clamour is not possible for Klepper. He lives under the motto "Keep still". With such behavior a small private sphere can be saved. The excesses in Kurfürstendamm are disconcerting. Jewish women receive on the open road slaps in the face. In spite of all that, Klepper further wants to write, as long as he may still remain in the Empire Literature Chamber. Since writing is a religious process for him. God has called the author and latter answers with a book - a stammered answer.
1936 German relatives recommend to the couple Klepper repeatedly to send both daughters in the sure foreign country. Klepper said the precaution would be unnecessary. The author probably knows about his isolation in Germany, however, he builds on the help of God.
In 1937, on 25 March the author from the Empire Literature Chamber is excluded. The reason is to Kleppers conviction his mixing marriage. The exclusion is out on an appeal in June suspended, and the Imperial War Department recommends Kleppers new novel "The Father" as a reading for the Wehrmacht members.
1938 However, the Empire Literature Chamber accuses the Christian Klepper "of slavish posture" which would contradict the "new mind". From March Klepper is supervised no more by the Empire Literature Chamber, but by the Propaganda Ministry. Nevertheless, in this precarious situation there is still a courageous journalist, the Klepper his organ as a platform offers: The Protestant theologian Prof. Mulert encourages the author to write for the "Christian world". Klepper remains careful. If Ernst Wiechert sits, nevertheless, because of the case Niemöller in the concentration camp. Klepper and his wife, Hanni register well as Jewish doctors and lawyers in Germany are no longer allowed to practice, how German Jews to sell their assets and emigrate. There should be a concentration camp near Weimar. Every German Jew should carry from 1 January 1939, in addition, the given name Israel or Sara and must give him everywhere. Polish Jews in Germany will be imprisoned or expelled. In spite of this news couple Klepper builds a new house in Berlin. In connection with the Kristallnacht Klepper disturb the arbitrary arrests of Jewish men by the Gestapo. Klepper's wife Hanni converts to the Christianity. Klepper is horrified about Hannis identification card.
1939 Both stepdaughters Kleppers would like to emigrate. Wife Hanni wants to remain. NS ideologist Rosenberg speaks openly, all Jews should leave the German Reich. German Jews must offer before certain valuables - as for example precious metals - to buying places to the sales.
When the war breaks out, Klepper does a patriotic note in his diary: He could not Germany the decline wish. As from November Jews for leaving their local authorized by the Gestapo need, Klepper expresses the suicide thought. Is suicide a sin? The older stepdaughter is the departure to England succeed. Because of the younger daughter Renate wants the couple to stay alive.
1940 February: A rumour reaches Klepper. Jews would be deported by Szczecin to Lublin. As a wife of an "Aryan" Hanni is protected. However, for daughter Renate it becomes more and more dangerous: Men of the Death's Head SS ring in the front door and inquire after the young girl. Renate converts - like before her mother - to the Christianity. Klepper receives news from an unfathomable process in the German Reich: Hindered are murdered. All called events weaken taken together the creativity of the sensitive Klepper so much that he manages the next novels (Katharina von Bora) no more. The vitality, however, he wants to keep. And thus he struggles dogged, tenaciously and, in the end, successfully for an entry permit for Renate to Sweden. For all that Klepper means on 26 July surprisingly, Germany will defeat England.
1941 From December, 1940 Klepper serves with the armed forces and will dismiss at the beginning of October, 1941 because of "military unworthiness", thus because of his "non-aryan marriage". Berlin's Jews are now in a very hard situation. Renate must carry discriminating Yellow badge and brings terrifying news with home: Confessed become after Litzmannstadt deports. The suicide thought lies to young Renate far. She hopes for survival. Klepper penetrates up to "Imperial Minister Dr. Frick" and obtains a document in which Renate ministerial protection from deportation is assured. This letter may Renates life admittedly only so long protected until the Sicherheitsdienst mercilessly intervenes. News about the deportation of Jews takes no end. Renate sways between depression and hope.
The girl tells the thoughts of suicide, if their departure fail should, not go back. News of massacres, perpetrated on Jews, invade from the east to Berlin.
1942 Hanni rejects the thought of triple suicide. Klepper does not know whether he should condemn the German warfare. After tantalizing back-and-forth Renate from Sweden receives the desired entry permit. Frick is no more responsible, in the meantime, for the exit permit, but now Eichmann. Klepper does not receive the permission and goes voluntarily to the death.

Title 
Kleppers faith in God seems steadfast. An external sign of this deep religiousness are the omnipresent Bible citations. Under one of the verses stands the book:
Be merciful to me, God, be merciful to me,
for my soul takes refuge in you.
Yes, in the shadow of your wings, I will take refuge,
until disaster has passed. Psalm 57,1
All citations reflect taken together upon the ten-year-period away the unprecedented God's trust and last imploring, yes, last of all shouting God in the highest need.

Persons 

Klepper reports about narrower contacts with writers: Reinhold Schneider and Rudolf Alexander Schröder are called multiple. Klepper mentions several prominent concentration camp prisoners - activists of the Bekennenden Kirche - thus, e.g., the pastor Ehrenberg-Bochum.

Style and themes 

The extensive memoirs can be read as a dialog with God. Klepper lays his welfare and woe in the hands of the Lord. However, besides, Klepper knows that he "one day", as Bergengruen formulates a little disrespectfully, before "his heavenly commander" will have to be responsible for his acting and letting. The form arises from the said. Klepper, deeply religious, has torn to and fro. He knows, he does mistakes, but he cannot from his skin. Among the wings of the Lord standing, the fate of the author's resume. And Klepper meticulously describes the process. The honesty and independence of the author is impressive with all. Before the surprised reader enters less the fighter Klepper than rather the silent sufferer.

Citations 
We should not push where we are not called (Man darf sich nicht hinzudrängen, wo man nicht gerufen ist).
God is the creator of the ability (Gott ist der Schöpfer des Sein-Könnens).

Bible citations 
Yahweh upholds all who fall, and raises up all those who are bowed down (Der HERR erhält alle, die da fallen, und richtet auf alle, die niedergeschlagen sind).
Behold, I am with you always, even to the end of the age (Siehe, ich bin bei euch alle Tage bis an der Welt Ende).
Blessed is the man who endures temptation (Selig ist der Mann, der die Anfechtung erduldet).
It will be, that whoever will call on the name of the Lord will be saved (Und soll geschehen, wer den Namen des HERRN anrufen wird, der soll selig werden).

Reception 
Bergengruen does in January 1957 in his detailed review to the first publication of the diaries no secret from his quite obviously deeply to seated resentments.
It looks as subordinate Bergengruen of sister Hildegard  of the author material motives in the publication of the diaries of brother.
Bergengruen speaks a truth. Renate's life was as of a "full Jew" - as one said in the NS linguistic usage - threatens in the German Reich. Klepper has had long enough time to support the emigration of the girl. Bergengruen can conclude in the connection from the memoirs neither on feelings of guilt nor on selfdoubt of the author.
To an opponent of the Nazi regime the subservient Klepper could not explain itself.
Indeed, Bergengruen certifies mental power to the author, however, it lacks him of feeling and imagination.
Bergengruen also calls details which are not discoverable in the available book: For example, when he Klepper after October 1941, in his Berlin home visits, the blended man of the house has glorified his period of service with the armed forces and has regretted his forcible elimination from the troop.
Klepper should have taken away his diaries from the access of the NS henchmen successfully, while he buried the papers.

Bibliography 
Source
Jochen Klepper: Unter dem Schatten deiner Flügel. Aus den Tagebüchern der Jahre 1932 - 1942. Lizenzausgabe 1997 (From the diaries of the years 1932 - 1942. Licensing Issue in 1997) Brunnen Verlag Gießen. pp. 671, 
Editions
Jochen Klepper: Unter dem Schatten deiner Flügel. Aus den Tagebüchern der Jahre 1932 - 1942. Deutsche Verlags-Anstalt Stuttgart 1956

Secondary literature
Frank-Lothar Kroll, N. Luise Hackelsberger, Sylvia Taschka (Editors): Werner Bergengruen: Schriftstellerexistenz in der Diktatur. Aufzeichnungen und Reflexionen zu Politik, Geschichte und Kultur 1949 bis 1963 (Writer existence in the dictatorship. Notes and reflections on politics, history and culture of 1949 to 1963). Vol. 22 of the series: Elke Fröhlich, Udo Wengst (Editors): Biographische Quellen zur Zeitgeschichte (Biographical sources on contemporary history). R. Oldenbourg Verlag Munich in 2005, pp. 298, 
Deutsche Literaturgeschichte (German literary history). Vol. 10. Paul Riegel and Wolfgang van Rinsum: Drittes Reich und Exil 1933-1945 (Third Reich and exile 1933-1945). pp. 81 – 83. dtv Munich in February 2004. pp. 303, 
Gero von Wilpert: Lexikon der Weltliteratur. Deutsche Autoren A - Z (Encyclopedia of World literature. German authors A - Z). p. 339. Stuttgart in 2004. pp. 698,

References

Note 
This article is based on the corresponding article in the German Wikipedia from 2007-12-6.

External links 
Portrait: Photo of Jochen Klepper 

1956 non-fiction books
German books
Diaries
Nazi Germany and Protestantism
Books published posthumously